Teppei Natori (Japanese: 名取鉄平, Natori Teppei; born 11 September 2000) is a Japanese racing driver.

Career

Karting
Natori started karting in 2014 when he was 14. He finished 6th in the ROK Cup International Final.

Japanese F4
In 2017 Natori made his single seater debut with Buzz International in the Japanese F4 series. He finished three of the four races he competed at in the points, gaining him 14 points and 13th in the standings.
In 2018 Natori got a full-time drive with the Honda Formula Dream Project where he would finish on the podium eleven times, three of those times being wins. Natori finished runner up to teammate and Red Bull Junior driver Yuki Tsunoda.

European Racing
Following his Japanese F4 success, Natori re-joined Carlin Buzz for the 2019 FIA F3 season. Natori finished the season with one point after an 8th place at Circuit de Spa-Francorchamps. Natori also drove for Carlin in the Euroformula Open Championship. He finished on the podium 3 times and at the 2nd race in Circuit de Barcelona-Catalunya Natori took pole, fastest lap and the race win. The only other driver to do this that season was the champion, Marino Sato.

Super Formula & Super Formula Lights
In 2020, Natori returned to his native Japan to contest the inaugural season of the newly rebranded Super Formula Lights championship with Toda Racing, and he claimed 4th. The next season, Natori's season was in doubt after being dropped by Honda works Factory. But he managed to get the necessary funding after settled a fundraiser. He competed with B-Max Racing for 2021 season, and he won the title off from Giuliano Alesi.

Natori also had one cameo race in 2020 in Super Formula with B-Max Racing, but unfortunately Natori could not compete due to medical reason.

Racing record

Career summary

Complete F4 Japanese Championship results
(key) (Races in bold indicate pole position; races in italics indicate points for the fastest lap of top ten finishers)

Complete Euroformula Open Championship results 
(key) (Races in bold indicate pole position) (Races in italics indicate fastest lap)

Complete FIA Formula 3 Championship results
(key) (Races in bold indicate pole position; races in italics indicate points for the fastest lap of top ten finishers)

† Driver did not finish the race, but was classified as he completed over 90% of the race distance.

Complete Super Formula Lights results 
(key) (Races in bold indicate pole position) (Races in italics indicate fastest lap)

Complete Super Formula results
(key) (Races in bold indicate pole position) (Races in italics indicate fastest lap)

Complete Super GT results
(key) (Races in bold indicate pole position; races in italics indicate fastest lap)

References

External links
 

2000 births
Living people
Japanese racing drivers
Euroformula Open Championship drivers
FIA Formula 3 Championship drivers
Carlin racing drivers

Super Formula drivers
Super GT drivers
Motopark Academy drivers
Japanese F4 Championship drivers
B-Max Racing drivers